Daniel Anthony Binchy (1899–1989) was a scholar of Irish linguistics and Early Irish law.

He was educated at Clongowes Wood College (1910–16), University College Dublin (UCD), and the King's Inns (1917–20), after which he was called to the bar. He also studied at the universities of Munich, Berlin, and Paris. From 1919 to 1920 he was Auditor of the Literary and Historical Society of UCD. From 1949 he worked as a senior professor of Celtic studies at the Dublin Institute for Advanced Studies. His activities are affectionately satirized in Brian O'Nolan's poem Binchy and Bergin and Best, originally printed in the Cruiskeen Lawn column in the Irish Times and now included in The Best of Myles. He was a close friend of Frank O'Connor.

He served as Ireland's ambassador to Germany from 1929 to 1932. While there he received instruction from Rudolf Thurneysen which allowed him to begin his study of Early Irish Law. He was, for a time, the main academic investigating the legal system and for some time his ideas were the orthodoxy. While his contributions still underlie the foundations, some of his analysis, however, has since been reexamined. Many of his attempts to connect early Irish law to Celtic Law and even to Indo-European law have come under considerable doubt. However, his contributions are also lasting on account of his production of numerous translations and editions of legal texts. His final major work, the six-volume Corpus Iuris Hibernici, collected almost all texts in the native Irish legal tradition, thus offering later scholars a firm ground to stand upon.

Binchy was elected a Foreign Honorary Member of the American Academy of Arts and Sciences in 1962. He was the uncle of  the author Maeve Binchy and the academic William Binchy.

References

External links
Binchy and Bergin and Best by Flann O'Brien

Celtic studies scholars
1899 births
1989 deaths
Fellows of the American Academy of Arts and Sciences
Academics of the Dublin Institute for Advanced Studies
Alumni of King's Inns
Alumni of University College Dublin
Ambassadors of Ireland to Germany
Auditors of the Literary and Historical Society (University College Dublin)
Binchy family
Humboldt University of Berlin alumni
Ludwig Maximilian University of Munich alumni
People educated at Clongowes Wood College
University of Paris alumni
20th-century Irish historians
Irish expatriates in Germany
Irish expatriates in France